Duke of Montrose (named for Montrose, Angus) is a title that has been created twice in the Peerage of Scotland. The title was created anew in 1707, for James Graham, 4th Marquess of Montrose, great-grandson of famed James Graham, 1st Marquess of Montrose. Montrose was elevated as a reward for his important support of the Act of Union. It has remained since then in the Graham family, tied to the chieftainship of Clan Graham.

The Duke's subsidiary titles are: Marquess of Montrose (created 1644), Marquess of Graham and Buchanan (1707), Earl of Montrose (1503), Earl of Kincardine (1644), Earl Graham (1722), Viscount Dundaff (1707), Lord Graham (1445), Lord Graham and Mugdock (1644), Lord Aberruthven, Mugdock and Fintrie (1707) and Baron Graham, of Belford (1722). The titles of Earl Graham and Baron Graham are in the Peerage of Great Britain; the rest are in the Peerage of Scotland. The eldest son of the Duke uses the courtesy title of Marquess of Graham and Buchanan.

The family seat is Auchmar House, near Loch Lomond, Stirlingshire. It was previously Buchanan Castle, near Drymen, Stirlingshire.

Lords Graham (1445)
Patrick Graham, 1st Lord Graham (d. c. 1466)
William Graham, 2nd Lord Graham (d. 1472), eldest son of the 1st Lord
William Graham, 3rd Lord Graham (1464–1513), became Earl of Montrose in 1503; a great-grandson of Robert III

Dukes of Montrose, first creation (1488)
Other titles: Earl of Crawford (1398), Lord Brechin and Navar (1472 for life)
David Lindsay, 1st Duke of Montrose (1440–1495), son of the 4th Earl of Crawford, was a loyal follower of James III; his dukedom was forfeit when James IV acceded in 1488, but it was restored to him for life in 1489

Earls of Montrose (1503)
Other titles: Lord Graham (1445)
William Graham, 1st Earl of Montrose (1464–1513), eldest son of the 2nd Lord Graham
William Graham, 2nd Earl of Montrose (1492–1571), eldest son of the 1st Earl
Robert Graham, Master of Montrose (d. 1547), eldest son of the 2nd Earl, predeceased his father
John Graham, 3rd Earl of Montrose (1548–1608), son of the Master of Montrose
John Graham, 4th Earl of Montrose (1573–1626), eldest son of the 3rd Earl
James Graham, 5th Earl of Montrose (1612–1650), became Marquess of Montrose in 1644

Marquesses of Montrose (1644)
Other titles: Earl of Montrose (1503), Earl of Kincardine (1644), Lord Graham (1445) and Lord Graham and Mugdock (1644)
James Graham, 1st Marquess of Montrose (1612–1650), only son of the 4th Earl
John Graham, Earl of Kincardine (1630–1645), eldest son of the 1st Marquess, predeceased his father unmarried
James Graham, 2nd Marquess of Montrose (1633–1669), second son of the 1st Marquess
James Graham, 3rd Marquess of Montrose (1657–1684), only son of the 2nd Marquess
James Graham, 4th Marquess of Montrose (1682–1742), became Duke of Montrose in 1707
James Graham, Earl of Kincardine (1703), eldest son of the 4th Marquess, died in infancy

Dukes of Montrose, second creation (1707)
Other titles: Marquess of Montrose (1644), Marquess of Graham and Buchanan (1707), Earl of Montrose (1503), Earl of Kincardine (1644), Earl of Kincardine (1707), Viscount Dundaff (1707), Lord Graham (1445), Lord Graham and Mugdock (1644) and Lord Aberruthven, Mugdock and Fintrie (1707)
James Graham, 1st Duke of Montrose (1682–1742), only son of the 3rd Marquess
Other titles (Lord Graham & 2nd Duke onwards): Earl Graham and Baron Graham (1722)
David Graham, Marquess of Graham (1705–1731), second son of the 1st Duke, predeceased his father without issue
William Graham, 2nd Duke of Montrose (1712–1790), seventh son of the 1st Duke
James Graham, 3rd Duke of Montrose (1755–1836), only son of the 2nd Duke
James Graham, Earl of Kincardine (1786–1787), eldest son of the 3rd Duke (then Lord Graham), died in infancy
James Graham, 4th Duke of Montrose (1799–1874), second son of the 3rd Duke
James Graham, Marquess of Graham (1845–1846), eldest son of the 4th Duke, died in infancy
James Graham, Marquess of Graham (1847–1872), second son of the 4th Duke, died without issue
Douglas Beresford Malise Ronald Graham, 5th Duke of Montrose (1852–1925), third and youngest son of the 4th Duke
James Graham, 6th Duke of Montrose (1878–1954), eldest son of the 5th Duke
James Angus Graham, 7th Duke of Montrose (1907–1992), elder son of the 6th Duke
James Graham, 8th Duke of Montrose (b. 1935), eldest son of the 7th Duke
James Graham, Marquess of Graham (born 16 August 1973), heir-apparent

Family tree

See also
Montrose Mausoleum
Buchanan Auld House
 – one of several vessels by that name

References

External links

Cracroft's Peerage page

Noble titles created in 1707
Dukedoms in the Peerage of Scotland
Noble titles created in 1488
Scottish society
Lists of Scottish people
People associated with Angus, Scotland
Duke
British landowners
1707 establishments in Scotland
Peerages created with special remainders
Clan Graham